The Province of Ontario is governed by a unicameral legislature, the Legislative Assembly of Ontario, which operates in the Westminster system of government.  The political party that wins the largest number of seats in the legislature normally forms the government, and the party's leader becomes premier of the province, i.e., the head of the government.

Ontario's current primary political parties are the Progressive Conservative Party of Ontario (PC), the Ontario New Democratic Party (NDP), the Ontario Liberal Party and the Green Party of Ontario.

Liberal hegemony before 1905

After the Province's indecisive first election in 1867, in which the Conservative John Sandfield Macdonald became the first Premier of Ontario, the Liberals under Edward Blake gained power in 1871 which they would hold until 1905. Blake left for federal politics in 1872, and Oliver Mowat would then serve as Premier until 1896.

Secure in its predominance in the rural parts of Southwestern Ontario, the Liberals also received support through their friendship with the Roman Catholic hierarchy, their use of patronage for political ends, and their dealings with the liquor trade. Mowat's success was buttressed by Arthur Sturgis Hardy's activity as a hard-nosed and down-to-earth politician in his service, as noted by Grip:

Acting as his own Attorney General, Mowat successfully promoted the cause of provincial sovereignty before the Judicial Committee of the Privy Council, winning key controversies over Provincial boundaries, jurisdiction over liquor licenses, trade and commerce, rivers and streams, timber, mineral rights and other matters.

Mowat was cautious in his approach to reform, preferring to do so by instalments. As George William Ross observed later, it reflected Mowat's cunning:

The agrarian revolt and anti-Catholic sentiment in 1894, exemplified by the rise of the Patrons of Industry and the Protestant Protective Association, was deftly handled by the Liberals and Conservatives declining to nominate a full bank of candidates in that election and fielding candidates that were nominated by these protest groups. The Patrons and PPA ceased to exist by 1898.

After Mowat left for federal politics in 1896, the premiership was passed to Hardy, who promoted the development of New Ontario with measures for colonization and incentives for the development of lumber and mining operations. He was followed by Ross in 1899, but a series of scandals in Ross' term of office would lead to his defeat in 1905.

Early 20th century, 1905-1943

Through reforming the Conservatives by establishing the Ontario Liberal-Conservative Association, reaching out to Catholics, and distancing the party from its federal counterpart, James Pliny Whitney was able to win the election of 1905. In that campaign, he stressed the necessity of public ownership of electrical development, saying, "The water power of Niagara should be as free as the air." In office, he worked to promote Ontario's industrial development through the creation of the Hydro-Electric Power Commission of Ontario, and also promoted social welfare through the passage of the first workmen's compensation law. He also maintained the party's support from the Orange Order by suppressing French-language instruction in schools through the issue of Regulation 17. He continued as Premier until his death in 1914. William Howard Hearst then took over as Premier, and served until his defeat in 1919.

The era was known for aggressive exploitation of the Province's natural resources. In 1919, Howard Ferguson (then Minister of Lands and Forests) declared, "My ambition has been to see the largest paper industry in the world established in the Province, and my attitude towards the pulp and paper industry has been directed towards assisting in bringing this about."

The rise of activism amongst farmers and workers following World War I resulted in the United Farmers of Ontario - Labour coalition government headed by E.C. Drury, which was in power from 1919 to 1923. The Conservatives then returned, and would retain control until the onset of the Great Depression, at which time the Liberals returned under Mitchell Hepburn, who would pursue aggressive policies in promoting Ontario's interests until 1943.

The Big Blue Machine, 1943-1985

The Progressive Conservative Party dominated Ontario's political system from 1943 to 1985 and earned the nickname of the Big Blue Machine. During this period the party was led by Red Tory premiers: George Drew, Leslie Frost, John Robarts and Bill Davis. These governments were responsible for some of the province's most progressive social legislation (including the Ontario Code of Human Rights), the creation of most of Ontario's welfare state and social programs, the creation of many Crown Corporations, and strong economic growth. Though the Conservatives were reduced to a minority government in 1975 and 1977, they stayed in power as they moved to the left of the rural-based Liberals. In addition, the Liberal and NDP opposition parties had been unwilling to cooperate. The Conservatives' were returned with a majority government in 1981.

However, in 1985, the party came back to the right, electing Frank Miller as leader at a leadership convention, following the retirement of popular longtime Red Tory Premier Bill Davis. This shift in policy did not help the party's fortunes, nor did Davis' announcement to extend full funding for Catholic schools, the latter which alienated the Conservatives' rural supporters. After 42 years of governing Ontario, the 1985 election reduced the Tories to a minority in the Legislature, with only four seats more than the opposition Liberals. The Tories won fewer votes overall than the Liberals. Miller attempted to forge an alliance with the NDP, as Bill Davis did during his minority terms (1975–1981), but they were unable to come to an agreement. The Liberals of David Peterson and the New Democrats of Bob Rae signed an accord (not a formal coalition), ousting Frank Miller, and ending one of the longest political dynasties in Canadian history.

After the Machine's collapse

Liberal governments under Peterson, 1985-1990

David Peterson was able to re-energize his party and lead them back into office. The Liberal-NDP confidence and supply agreement of 1985-1987 allowed Peterson's Liberals to form a minority government. In exchange for supporting certain Liberal policies and not defeating Peterson's government in the Legislature, the Liberals agreed to pass certain NDP policies to which Miller had previously been unwilling to agree.

In the 1987 election, Peterson's Liberals won a substantial majority in the Legislature. Peterson's record in office was a mixed one. During his five years in power, Ontario recorded some of its best economic times; however towards the end of his tenure government spending increased. Although his government predicted a surplus, Ontario's debt was over $3 billion by the end of the year 1990.

Bob Rae and the "Social Contract", 1990-1995

The Liberals paid dearly by calling a snap election three years into their mandate in 1990. Before Peterson called the election, his government stood at a 54% approval rating in the polls. However, the early election call turned out to be his undoing as the public interpreted it as arrogance. Several scandals also broke out after the election call and some suspected the Liberals of calling an election just to dodge the upcoming recession. In the most surprising election results in Ontario's history, the NDP was able to win a majority government, however with only 37% of the vote. This government was Ontario's second social democratic government (after the United Farmers government of Ernest Drury 1919-1923), and its track record would keep the NDP out of serious contention for power in Ontario until the present.

The NDP took power in the midst of one of the worst recessions since the Great Depression. Though they campaigned predominantly on the promise of a public auto insurance system, they backtracked on this policy, causing a split between Premier Rae and his more left-wing ministers. They increased spending in the public sector to stimulate employment and productivity. However, due to the unforeseen severity of the recession, the federal government cutbacks, the NDP was faced with lower revenues and higher expenses leading to an increasing deficit.

To combat the growing deficit, New Democrats introduced cutbacks to social spending, and the Social Contract, which forced public-sector workers to take unpaid "holidays" or "Rae Days" every year. They also introduced wage freezes The Social Contract led to most of the labour movement, especially longtime NDP ally Buzz Hargrove and his Canadian Auto Workers union (CAW), the Ontario Public Service Employees Union (OPSEU), and other public sector unions turning its backs on Bob Rae. Many union members vowed to bring his government down. Rae also introduced unpopular revenue-raising taxes and operations that hurt his election prospects. Thousands of party members resigned from the NDP and it became evident that the party was headed for a defeat in the 1995 election.

The "Common Sense Revolution", 1995-2003

By 1995, Ontario's unemployment rate was skyrocketing and the deficit was growing bigger, leaving most people convinced that the government of Bob Rae had become ineffective after four and one-half years of an international recession. Commentators predicted an easy win for Lyn McLeod's Liberals, but the resurgent Progressive Conservative Party of Mike Harris, which had been reduced to third-party status since the 1987 election, made a comeback and won a majority. Macleod alienated voters by flip-flopping on campaign issues such as civil unions for same-sex couples. Towards the end of the campaign, the Liberals attempted to copy many Tory policies. Mike Harris, on the other hand, campaigned on a controversial agenda known as the Common Sense Revolution, promising to solve Ontario's economic woes and problems with lower taxation, smaller government and pro-business policies to create jobs. He also campaigned as a populist, which gave him the support of several working-class ridings that normally voted NDP. The 1995 election gave the PC Party a large majority, bringing the Tories back into power, however not under their traditional centrist or Red Tory agenda.

The new conservative government of Mike Harris implemented a programme of cuts to social spending and taxes (the "Common Sense Revolution") that lowered taxes for most Ontarians and especially businesses. However, it also drew controversy for "downloading" or transferring the cost of programs and responsibilities to municipalities, without supplying finances to do so.

Teachers' strike

In 1997, the teachers' union protested with a province-wide two-week strike against the Harris government's education initiatives. It was the largest teachers' strike in North American history. The teachers had a contract so the government determined that the strike was illegal.
126,000 teachers went on strike which affected 2.1 million students in the province. The strike was over the contentious issue of who holds the power to set education policy in the province. Bill 160 put control of the education system in the hands of the provincial government. It eliminated the ability of school boards and teachers' unions to set classroom and teaching conditions through collective bargaining. The bill also allowed the government to regulate class sizes, education property tax rates, teachers preparations time, the amount of time teachers and student spend in class and the use of non-certified instructors.

That year, the Harris government also amalgamated Metro Toronto and its six cities into the new "Megacity" of Toronto despite their opposition.

Mike Harris was re-elected with a majority, despite a loss of 23 seats in the 1999 election, defeating Dalton McGuinty's Liberals, which gained 5 seats (27 seats were eliminated from legislature from the 1995 election). Harris' victory was largely due to a strong campaign by the NDP, as McGuinty's Liberals were able to gain only 8.8% of the popular vote to finish at 39.9% vs. the Tory 45.1%.  In addition, the emergence of the Canadian economy from the recession led to many jobs in Ontario since the time Harris had taken office, and Harris' record on tax and deficit reduction all were positive features to Harris campaign.  Negative campaigning by the Tories, which featured ads claiming that McGuinty was "not up to the job" also helped Harris's re-election bid.

Afterwards, the government's critics alleged that the government's cuts to the Ministry of the Environment and privatization of water-testing laboratories led to the lack of oversight that resulted in six deaths during a 2000 E. coli outbreak in the public water system of Walkerton, Ontario. Harris first balanced budget was also revealed to have occurred because the government leased the province's 407 ETR toll highway to a private-sector consortium for 99 years.  Harris stepped down as leader in 2002 and was replaced by Ernie Eves following a leadership election. Eves's government was chiefly notable for stopping Harris's unpopular plan to privatize the public electricity system, but not before some parts of the utility had been sold to private interests such as Bruce Power.

The Liberals return to power, 2003-2018

In the October 2003 election, Dalton McGuinty led the Liberals to victory against Ernie Eves and his controversy-plagued Tories, coming in with a solid majority. McGuinty's major promises revolved around increasing health care funding, unraveling Mike Harris's education reforms, and not raising taxes.

Shortly after the election, however, the former provincial auditor undertook a study that revealed that the Harris-Eves Tories had hidden a deficit of at least $5.6 billion. Minister of Finance Greg Sorbara released a budget introducing tax increases on commodities and businesses, the introduction of a new income tax called the "Ontario Health Premium" for all but low-income Ontarians, the de-listing of health-care services from Ontario Health Insurance Plan (OHIP). The budget, along with the failure to prevent construction on the environmentally sensitive Oak Ridges Moraine after his election made the McGuinty government unpopular during its first few months. During his second month in office, McGuinty had an approval rating of only 8%, a record low.  Somewhat surprisingly, even though the new Liberal government were viewed to have broken some of their promises, on December 14, 2003, 60% of Ontarians in an Ipsos-Reid Poll (on behalf of Globe and Mail/CFTO/CFRB) said they were better off governed by the Liberals now than the Conservatives under Ernie Eves.

However, things improved after his first year in office for the public opinion of the Liberals. The Ontario government was able to negotiate a national health accord with the federal government and the other provinces. Free immunizations against chicken pox and meningitis were added to the list of OHIP-covered immunizations for children. McGuinty announced plans for the creation of the "Green Belt" in the Greater Toronto Area to help control urban sprawl, and plans for the creation of a "Citizen's Assembly" to research electoral reform were also announced. The Tories on the other hand took a shift back to the centre and elected John Tory, a former aide of Bill Davis, to lead the party. John Tory stated he opposed the privatization that was advocated by Mike Harris and Ernie Eves, and supported the elimination of health premiums.

The McGuinty government also brought forward a number of regulatory initiatives including legislation to allow patrons to bring their own wine to restaurants, banning junk food in public schools, restricting smoking in public places (especially where minors are present), and requiring students to stay in school until age 18. The government also enacted changes to the Ontario Heritage Act in 2005.  Following a series of high-profile maulings, the government also moved to ban Pit Bulls; a move which has generated mixed support.

In the summer of 2003, a Court of Appeal for Ontario rulings resulted in Ontario becoming the first of Canada's provinces and territories to legalize same-sex marriage. (See Same-sex marriage in Ontario.) In response to the court decision, the McGuinty Liberals updated the province's legislation relating to married couples to include same-sex couples.

In 2007 it was announced that the Ontario Citizen's Assembly on Electoral Reform had recommended that Ontario switch to a new electoral system known as mixed-member proportional representation. As a result, the Government of Ontario set the date for a referendum on the issue to be October 10, 2007, which was also the date set for the provincial election. The Government also set a "super majority" requirement that requires the support of at least 60% of voters and majority support in 60% of all Ontario ridings for the proposal to be adopted.  The MMP system was rejected by Ontario voters.

In 2012, Dalton McGuinty announced his intention to resign from his post as Premier, which left the legislature hung for six months and the Liberal Leadership open.  On Saturday, January 26, 2013, Kathleen Wynne prevailed at the party's convention. She became the first female Premier of Ontario and she became the first lesbian premier of any province. Wynne would win the 2014 election, holding on to a majority. Wynne campaigned on a platform that was considered further left, and included policies that had been also proposed by the NDP.

Wynne's government would continue its progressive agenda during her term as Premier, including a minimum-wage hike, an updated sex education curriculum, safe-injection sites, affordable housing, increased investment in public transit, reduced tuition for students and increased spending on health care, including free drug prescriptions for persons under 25. The Wynne government sold a majority interest in Hydro One, the electricity distribution system in Ontario, the proceeds enabling the government to balance the budget. After signing a number of contracts with renewable energy producers for electricity, electricity rates to consumers increased substantially and the Wynne government controversially moved to lower rates by renegotiating debt until the 2020s. By the end of her term in 2018, the Liberals were trailing badly in opinion polls.

Liberal decline, Progressive Conservatives return (2018-present) 
The results of the 2018 Ontario General Election saw a number of significant changes in the distribution of seats among all three major parties, in some cases unprecedented in the province's history. The Liberal Party of Ontario lost the greatest number of seats, falling to just 7/126 seats, with roughly 19% of the popular vote, and losing Official Party Status for the first time in their history. The Progressive Conservative Party of Ontario, in contrast, saw a large increase in seats (and a modest increase in votes) obtaining 76/124 possible seats and roughly 41% of the popular vote. The New Democratic Party of Ontario, considered the main opponents to the PC's this election, saw a significant increase in both votes and seats in the Legislature, obtaining 40/124 seats and roughly 34% of the popular vote. The result between these two parties saw the Progressive Conservatives form a majority government, while the New Democratic Party became the Official Opposition for only the third time in its history (last seen in the Ontario general election of 1987). Finally, the 2018 Ontario Election also saw the Green Party of Ontario obtain its first-ever seat in the legislature, no less won by the party leader, Mike Schreiner, in the district of Guelph, with roughly 5% of the popular vote, province-wide.

Following the election results, there remains significant uncertainty as to the goals and agenda under the Progressive Conservatives (PC), led by Doug Ford as Premier. This was in part due to the party's last-minute abandoning of the official party platform, set off by a sudden change in leadership several months before the election due to the resignation of PC leader Patrick Brown, and the subsequent nomination battle which saw Ford elected Premier, by a narrow margin. The new "platform" under Ford's PC party was composed of a series of promises, with anticipated costs, rather than a fully costed platform as the other major parties had developed. Prior to his nomination for PCs, Ford had intended to run for the Mayoral seat in the City of Toronto (previously held by his brother, Rob Ford), moving from the role as city councillor, in opposition to the current Mayor seeking re-election, John Tory, who himself was Leader of the PC party previously, from 2004-2009.

Overview of Ontario federal politics

In general, Ontario is a mixed bag in terms of political trends, despite the fact that the federal Liberals dominated the province from 1993 to 2004 against a "divided right" between the centrist Progressive Conservative Party and strongly conservative Canadian Alliance. However, the merger of these two right-wing parties into the new, right-wing Conservative Party of Canada in 2003 has reduced this Liberal dominance.

 Central and Eastern Ontario are more conservative.  The exceptions are in Ottawa and Kingston, where there is a large Liberal and NDP support. Most of the region tends to vote solidly for the Ontario Progressive Conservative Party on the provincial level and for the Conservative Party of Canada on the federal level.
 The Greater Toronto Area tends to be split between Conservative and Liberal support. The inner "416" ridings (i.e., those inside Toronto) are usually Liberal and NDP, while the surrounding region "905 belt" is split between Conservatives and Liberals.
 Most of Northern Ontario is a hotbed for Liberal and NDP support. The southern border areas are more conservative than the northern areas, however, both fiscally and socially. This is most notable in the Parry Sound and Muskoka, Nipissing Districts.
 Southwestern Ontario is similar to the adjacent US Midwest, with the urban areas generally leaning left (especially Windsor, which is a union bastion and thus an NDP stronghold), and the rural areas being far more conservative.

Further reading

See also

Government of Ontario
Legislative Assembly of Ontario
Politics of Canada
Political culture of Canada
Political parties of Ontario
List of Ontario general elections
Council of the Federation

References

External links
 While MPPs Squabble, Ontario Patients Suffer due to lack of Electronic Health Records by Michael Rachlis, The Star, June 12, 2009